In mathematics, power iteration (also known as the power method) is an eigenvalue algorithm: given a diagonalizable matrix , the algorithm will produce a number , which is the greatest (in absolute value) eigenvalue of , and a nonzero vector , which is a corresponding eigenvector of , that is, .
The algorithm is also known as the Von Mises iteration.

Power iteration is a very simple algorithm, but it may converge slowly. The most time-consuming operation of the algorithm is the multiplication of matrix  by a vector, so it is effective for a very large sparse matrix with appropriate implementation.

The method

The power iteration algorithm starts with a vector , which may be an approximation to the dominant eigenvector or a random vector. The method is described by the recurrence relation

So, at every iteration, the vector  is multiplied by the matrix  and normalized. 

If we assume  has an eigenvalue that is strictly greater in magnitude than its other eigenvalues and the starting vector  has a nonzero component in the direction of an eigenvector associated with the dominant eigenvalue, then a subsequence  converges to an eigenvector associated with the dominant eigenvalue.

Without the two assumptions above, the sequence  does not necessarily converge. In this sequence,
 ,
The presence of the term  implies that  does not converge unless . Under the two assumptions listed above, the sequence  defined by
 
converges to the dominant eigenvalue (with Rayleigh quotient).

One may compute this with the following algorithm (shown in Python with NumPy):

#!/usr/bin/env python3

import numpy as np

def power_iteration(A, num_iterations: int):
    # Ideally choose a random vector
    # To decrease the chance that our vector
    # Is orthogonal to the eigenvector
    b_k = np.random.rand(A.shape[1])

    for _ in range(num_iterations):
        # calculate the matrix-by-vector product Ab
        b_k1 = np.dot(A, b_k)

        # calculate the norm
        b_k1_norm = np.linalg.norm(b_k1)

        # re normalize the vector
        b_k = b_k1 / b_k1_norm

    return b_k

power_iteration(np.array([[0.5, 0.5], [0.2, 0.8]]), 10)
The vector  to an associated eigenvector. Ideally, one should use the Rayleigh quotient in order to get the associated eigenvalue.

This algorithm is used to calculate the Google PageRank.

The method can also be used to calculate the spectral radius (the eigenvalue with the largest magnitude, for a square matrix) by computing the Rayleigh quotient

Analysis
The starting vector  can be written as a linear combination of the columns of V:

By assumption,  has a nonzero component in the direction of the dominant eigenvalue, so .

The computationally useful recurrence relation for  can be rewritten as:

where the expression:  is more amenable to the following analysis.

The expression above simplifies as 

It follows that:

Using this fact,  can be written in a form that emphasizes its relationship with  when k is large:

The sequence  is bounded, so it contains a convergent subsequence. Note that the eigenvector corresponding to the dominant eigenvalue is only unique up to a scalar, so although the sequence  may not converge,
 is nearly an eigenvector of A for large k.

Alternatively, if A is diagonalizable, then the following proof yields the same result

Let λ1, λ2, ..., λm be the m eigenvalues (counted with multiplicity) of A and let v1, v2, ..., vm be the corresponding eigenvectors.

The initial vector  can be written:

If  is chosen randomly (with uniform probability), then c1 ≠ 0 with probability 1.  Now,

On the other hand:

Therefore,  converges to (a multiple of) the eigenvector . The convergence is geometric, with ratio

where  denotes the second dominant eigenvalue. Thus, the method converges slowly if there is an eigenvalue close in magnitude to the dominant eigenvalue.

Applications
Although the power iteration method approximates only one eigenvalue of a matrix, it remains useful for certain computational problems. For instance, Google uses it to calculate the PageRank of documents in their search engine, and Twitter uses it to show users recommendations of whom to follow. The power iteration method is especially suitable for sparse matrices, such as the web matrix, or as the matrix-free method that does not require storing the coefficient matrix  explicitly, but can instead access a function evaluating matrix-vector products . For non-symmetric matrices that are well-conditioned the power iteration method can outperform more complex Arnoldi iteration. For symmetric matrices, the power iteration method is rarely used, since its convergence speed can be easily increased without sacrificing the small cost per iteration; see, e.g., Lanczos iteration and LOBPCG.

Some of the more advanced eigenvalue algorithms can be understood as variations of the power iteration. For instance, the inverse iteration method applies power iteration to the matrix . Other algorithms look at the whole subspace generated by the vectors . This subspace is known as the Krylov subspace. It can be computed by Arnoldi iteration or Lanczos iteration.

See also
 Rayleigh quotient iteration
 Inverse iteration

References

Numerical linear algebra
Articles with example Python (programming language) code